Pseudochromis matahari the sunburst dottyback, is a species of ray-finned fish from Indonesia, which is a member of the family Pseudochromidae.

References

matahari
Taxa named by Anthony C. Gill
Taxa named by Mark van Nydeck Erdmann
Taxa named by Gerald R. Allen
Fish described in 2009